, or kana spelling, is a style of romanization of Japanese originally devised  for entering Japanese into  while using a Western QWERTY keyboard.

One conversion method has been standardized as JIS X 4063:2000 (Keystroke to KANA Transfer Method Using Latin Letter Key for Japanese Input Method); however, the standard explicitly states that it is intended as a means of input, not as a method of romanization.

Wāpuro rōmaji is now frequently employed in general-purpose computer input as well as word processing, but the name lives on. Wāpuro-style romanizations are also frequently used by native speakers of Japanese in informal contexts, as well as by many fans of anime and other aspects of Japanese culture. A common characteristic of these (often online) cases is the avoidance of hard-to-type circumflexes or macrons. Also, some ambiguities in spelling may exist.

Spelling conventions

In practice, there are as many variants of wāpuro rōmaji as there are manufacturers of word processing and IME software. Some conventions, however, differ from standard romanizations:
The Nihon-shiki forms of romanization take precedence over other romanizations.
This is commonly employed for modern katakana combinations like , which would be entered texi, thi, or t'i. However, on some systems l is treated the same as r when followed by a vowel or "y".
 ,  and  may also be romanized as jya, jyu and jyo respectively.  This matches the kana closely, but is used by neither Nihon-shiki/Kunrei (which would be zya, zyu, zyo) nor Hepburn (ja, ju, jo).
 The Hepburn spelling tchi for  may be rejected, and cchi may be required instead.
 The Hepburn spelling mma is likely to be rendered , not the intended  (nma).  This is not an issue for revised Hepburn, which eliminates the -mm- forms in favor of -nm-.
 Moraic n, can be entered as nn, n or n'. While moraic n can be typed in simply as n in some cases, in other cases it is necessary to type in a non-ambiguous form to prevent the IME from interpreting the n as belonging to a kana from the na column ( na,  ni,  nu,  ne,  no).
 Phonetic names can often be used for Japanese typographic symbols not found on standard keyboards. For example, in some IMEs ～ can be entered as nami (wave) or kara (from) and an ellipsis (...) can be entered as tenten (point point).

Phonetic accuracy
Unlike Kunrei and Hepburn, wāpuro style is based on a one-to-one transcription of the kana. For example, in standard Japanese the kana  can be pronounced in two different ways: as  meaning "king", and as  meaning "to chase". Kunrei and Hepburn spell the two differently as ō and ou, because the former is a long vowel while the latter has an o that happens to be followed by a u; however, wāpuro style simply transcribes the kana and renders them both as ou. Likewise, the irregularly spelled particles wa, e and o must be entered as written (ha, he and wo respectively), not as pronounced (unlike Kunrei and Hepburn, which transcribe the pronunciation).

See also
 Japanese language and computers

References

Romanization of Japanese
Japanese writing system